Fer-de-Lance is French for spearhead (literally "iron of the lance"), and may refer to:

Snakes of the genus Bothrops, especially:
B. lanceolatus, the Martinique lancehead snake
B. caribbaeus, the Saint Lucia lancehead
B. atrox, the common lancehead, native to tropical South America east of the Andes and to Trinidad
B. asper, the terciopelo or Central American lancehead, native to Central and northwestern South America
B. insularis, the golden lancehead, a critically endangered Brazilian species

Other:
 Fer-de-Lance (novel), a 1934 Nero Wolfe series novel by Rex Stout
 Fer-de-Lance (comics), Teresa Vasquez, a Marvel comics super-villain
Fer-de-Lance (film) a 1974 film starring David Janssen

Animal common name disambiguation pages